Carlsbad is a census-designated place and unincorporated community in northwest Tom Green County, Texas, United States.  It lies along U.S. Route 87 northwest of the city of San Angelo, the county seat of Tom Green County.  Its elevation is 2,024 feet (617 m).  Although Carlsbad is unincorporated, it has a post office, with the ZIP code of 76934; the ZCTA for ZIP Code 76934 had a population of 1,332 at the 2000 census.

This was a new CDP for the 2010 census with a population of 719.

Located along the North Concho River, Carlsbad was founded in 1907 under the name of Hughes.  When the Post Office required the community to be renamed, residents chose the name of the spa town of Karlsbad in Bohemia, after local wells were discovered to yield mineral water.

Geography
Carlsbad is located at  (31.611248, -100.640647).

Demographics

2020 census

As of the 2020 United States census, there were 622 people, 133 households, and 75 families residing in the CDP.

References

External links
Profile of Carlsbad from the Handbook of Texas Online

Census-designated places in Tom Green County, Texas
Unincorporated communities in Texas
Census-designated places in Texas
Unincorporated communities in Tom Green County, Texas